Emil Kamberov (born 7 April 1996) is a Bulgarian footballer, who plays as midfielder.

Career

Emil Kamberov spent a couple of short spells on loan at POFC Rakovski and FC Lokomotiv Gorna Oryahovitsa.

On 30 June 2015, Kamberov won the Bulgarian U19 cup with Botev Plovdiv and scored a goal in the final game against Lokomotiv Sofia.

On 7 January 2016, Kamberov returned to Botev Plovdiv. On 23 January he scored a goal during the 4-1 win in a friendly game over ACS Poli Timișoara.

On 16 April 2016, Kamberov made his A Group debut. He came on as a substitute during the 2-2 home draw against Montana. On 23 April he came on as a substitute again during the 2-2 draw with PFC Pirin Blagoevgrad.

References

External links
 

1996 births
Living people
Bulgarian footballers
Botev Plovdiv players
FC Lokomotiv Gorna Oryahovitsa players
FC Oborishte players
First Professional Football League (Bulgaria) players
Footballers from Plovdiv
Association football midfielders